Turkeyfoot was an area in Hancock County, West Virginia, United States.  Named after the shape of the intersection of several roads, the Turkeyfoot oil field was located in the area.

References 

Unincorporated communities in West Virginia